Stanislav Selyanin (born 12 August 1936) is a Soviet speed skater. He competed in two events at the 1968 Winter Olympics.

References

External links
 

1936 births
Living people
Soviet male speed skaters
Olympic speed skaters of the Soviet Union
Speed skaters at the 1968 Winter Olympics
People from Yakutsk
Sportspeople from Sakha